Subhadra is an important character in the Mahabharata. 

Subhadra may also refer to:

 Subhadra Kumari Chauhan (1904–1948), Indian poet famous for her Hindi songs
 Subhadra Pradhan (born 1986), member of the India women's national field hockey team
 Subhadra (film), a 1941 Indian Kannada film